Daniel "Daan" Wepener Bekker (9 February 1932 – 22 October 2009) was a South African boxer, who won the bronze medal in the Heavyweight division (+ 91 kg) at the 1956 Summer Olympics in Melbourne, Australia. Four years later in Rome he captured the silver medal in the same category.

Amateur career
Bekker was the South African Heavyweight Champion from 1955–1959 and 1961.

Amateur results
1956 won the Heavyweight bronze medal at the Melbourne Olympics.
Defeated José Giorgetti (Argentina) KO-1
Lost to Pete Rademacher (USA) KO-3
1958 won the Commonwealth Games in Cardiff, Wales.
Defeated S. Renaud (Canada) TKO-1
Defeated Gbadegesin Salawu (Nigeria) TKO-2
Defeated David Thomas (England) PTS
1960 won the Heavyweight silver medal at the Rome Olympics.
Defeated Władysław Jędrzejewski (Poland) TKO-1
Defeated Obrad Sretenovic (Yugoslavia) KO-1
Defeated Günter Siegmund (United Team of Germany) PTS (4-1)
Lost to Franco De Piccoli (Italy) KO-2

Death
Bekker died on 18 October 2009 after a long struggle with Parkinson's and Alzheimer's diseases.

References

External links
 

1932 births
2009 deaths
People from Dordrecht, Eastern Cape
Heavyweight boxers
Deaths from Parkinson's disease
Deaths from Alzheimer's disease
Deaths from dementia in South Africa
Olympic boxers of South Africa
Boxers at the 1956 Summer Olympics
Boxers at the 1960 Summer Olympics
Olympic silver medalists for South Africa
Olympic bronze medalists for South Africa
Sportspeople from Pretoria
Commonwealth Games gold medallists for South Africa
Boxers at the 1958 British Empire and Commonwealth Games
Olympic medalists in boxing
Medalists at the 1956 Summer Olympics
Medalists at the 1960 Summer Olympics
Afrikaner people
South African male boxers
Commonwealth Games medallists in boxing
Medallists at the 1958 British Empire and Commonwealth Games